Jung-sook, also spelled Jeong-sook or Jong-suk, is a Korean feminine given name. Its meaning differs based on the hanja used to write each syllable of the name. There are 75 hanja with the reading "jung" and 13 hanja with the reading "sook" on the South Korean government's official list of hanja which may be registered for use in given names. According to South Korean government data, Jung-sook was the fourth-most popular name for newborn girls in 1940, rising to second place by 1950.

People with this name include:
Ho Jong-suk (1908–1991), Korean independence activist, later a North Korean politician
Kim Jong-suk (1917 or 1919–1949), Korean anti-Japanese guerrilla, first wife of North Korean leader Kim Il-sung
Oh Jeong-suk (1935–2008), South Korean pansori musician
Kim Jung-sook (born 1954), South Korean classical vocalist, wife of South Korean president Moon Jae-in
Yun Jeong-suk (born 1966), South Korean fencer
Lee Jeong-sook (born 1971), South Korean fencer
Lim Jeong-sook (born 1972), South Korean field hockey player
Jung Jung-suk (1982–2011), South Korean football player

Fictional characters with this name include:
Yoon Jung-sook, in 2004 South Korean television series Sweet 18

See also
List of Korean given names

References

Korean feminine given names